David Mercer (born 4 August 1960 in Edinburgh) is a British former alpine skier who competed in the 1984 Winter Olympics.

References

External links
 

1960 births
Living people
Sportspeople from Edinburgh
Scottish male alpine skiers
Olympic alpine skiers of Great Britain
Alpine skiers at the 1984 Winter Olympics